The 89th Regiment of Foot was an infantry regiment in the British Army from 1779 to 1783.

The regiment was raised in Worcestershire and posted to the Leeward Islands. The first Colonel-Commandant was Lieutenant-Colonel Hon. Lucius Ferdinand Cary, the only son of the 7th Viscount Falkland. He died in Tobago in August 1780.

The regiment returned to England in 1783 and was disbanded.

Colonels
Colonels of the regiment were:
1779–1780: Lieutenant-Colonel Hon. Lucius Ferdinand Cary
1780–1783: Gen. Sir William Medows, KB

References

Infantry regiments of the British Army
Military units and formations established in 1779
Military units and formations disestablished in 1783
1779 establishments in England